The feral goat is the domestic goat (Capra aegagrus hircus) when it has become established in the wild.  Feral goats occur in many parts of the world.

Species 
Feral goats consist of many breeds of goats, all of which stem from the wild goat, C. aegagrus. Although breeds can look different, they all share similar characteristics. Physically, both domestic and feral goats can be identified by their prominent straight horns (more prominent on male goats), rectangular pupils, and coarse hair. In addition, most domesticated goats/feral goats lie around 100 – 120lbs, with heavier goats tending to be wild goats.

Behavior 
The feral goat is seen in Australia, New Zealand, Ireland, Great Britain, Hawaii, Brazil, Honduras, Lebanon, Panama, Madagascar, Comoro Islands, Mauritius, Réunion, New Guinea, the Galapagos, Cuba and in many other parts of the world. When feral goats reach large populations in habitats which are not adapted to them, they may become an invasive species with serious negative effects, such as removing native scrub, trees and other vegetation. Feral goats are included in the 100 of the World's Worst Invasive Alien Species.  

However, in other circumstances they may become a natural component of the habitat, even replacing locally extinct wild goats. 

Feral goats are sometimes used for conservation grazing, to control the spread of undesirable scrub or weeds in open natural habitats such as chalk grassland and heathland.

Diet
Goats are herbivores whose diet consists of plant materials such as trees, shrubs, and grasses. Due to their stomachs, which is four-chambered, goats have the capacity to eat many plants that are typically toxic to other animals. Capeweed, for example, is toxic to most animals due to the presence of high nitrate levels. However, goats have the capacity to process these chemicals and eat capeweed with little issue.  Though goats stomachs are incredibly durable, some materials still remain deadly to goats and goats will seldom eat these materials. Molds, for example, are still highly toxic for goats and have the capacity to kill a goat if consumed. Nightshades and wilted fruit trees are also toxic to goats and any presence of Listeria bacteria can prove fatal to goats as they are incredibly susceptible to the bacteria. Outside of plant materials, goats have also been seen attempting to eat nearly any object that they're curious about as well. Notably, goats have been seen eating litter such as tin cans and cardboard and although their stomachs can process the material, they get no nutritional value from it and should still be eating plant materials.

Predators 
Having a wide habitat range, goats also have a wide array of predators. Canine species are particularly impactful predators of the goat. These include coyotes, wolves, and foxes. In addition to these species, other animals such as bobcats and birds of prey, such as eagles, have been noted to hunt and eat feral goats.

Feral goats throughout the world

Australia

Majorca

Majorca or Mallorca is an island in the Balearic Islands, which are a part of Spain and located in the Mediterranean Sea. These feral goats, also known as Balearen bocs, were introduced by humans between 2300 and 2050 BC. They were originally used as a food source but eventually they began being a threat to domesticated goats and native tree species.  The biggest threat to their conservation is hybridization with current domestic goats, but both are the same subspecies (Capra aegagrus hircus). These populations threaten the growth of new trees in several forests on the island, specially oak forests.

England
Around 5000 BP non-native goats also known as British primitive goats were brought to Britain as domestic stock, bread for milk and meat. Today, the goat species Capra hircus are still present in the country with a total population of 5,000–10,000 individuals. The number of goats are constantly changing due to management, conservation, reproduction and removal. This invasive goat species is destructive to the natural habitat and therefore means of removal are available. One way these goats are managed is through hunting. In England they do not have a closed season for goat hunting, and are able to be hunted year round.

Ireland
Feral goats were brought to Ireland over 4000 years ago for their meat, milk, and hair. They are typically found in mountainous regions of Ireland and have no known predators, not even humans. Feral goats are common in many areas of the Irish west coast including counties Mayo, Donegal and Kerry. There are about 5,000 goats in Ireland, and though they are not formally protected, they are often ignored by humans and not typically hunted. They are destructive when it comes to native species because they mainly eat grass, shrubs and young trees, but as of now there is no plan to eradicate them from the country.

New Zealand
Three goat species has been known to exist within New Zealand, namely the Arapawa goat, the Auckland Island goat and the New Zealand goat. Out of the three, the Arapawa goat's populations are too small for it to be any threat at all to the Arapaoa Island that it resides on, with them today being noted to be critically endangered. 

The Auckland Island goat was introduced in the 19th century to serve as a food source for castaways on the Auckland Island. Although about 100 goats were observed to have lived on the island at the time, this population managed to do considerable damage to the island's ecosystem. As a result, the goat population was located and dealt with accordingly. About 60 goats were exported off the island for domestication in 1992 and the remaining population was killed off. As of 1999, the Auckland Island goat has been considered extinct. 

The last species, the New Zealand feral goats, were brought onto the North and South Islands in 1773 by early explorers, whalers, sealers and settlers who brought goats with them for food and bartering. Over time, more goats were brought in for a variety of purposes, from livestock to the handling of other invasive plant species. This problem culminated in 14% of New Zealand now being populated by feral goats, all of which have begun to destroy the natural florae of the islands. Currently, hunting and training Judas goats are the primary means of handling the threat but this has not done much to stop the goats and they still remain a threat.

Scotland
The feral goats of Scotland were brought in by Neolithic-era humans for farming purposes but were likely abandoned around the late 1700s due to the Highland Clearances, the evictions of a significant number of tenants in the Scottish Highlands and Islands. These people were unable to bring their livestock with them and, instead, had to leave them to roam the Highlands. The goats from this collective of livestock were able to get a foothold in this environment however and within little time, the population of Highland goats exploded to about 3,000 to 4,000. Though they are very common to see, they are also heavily considered both a nonnative, invasive species by the Scottish government as well as a major threat to the Scottish Highlands with there being evidence of the goats contributing to grazing pressures on at least 18 different conservational sites. Hunting remains as one of the primary ways that the population is handled and though a few population management plans have been discussed, few have gotten off of the ground.

United States
One of the most acute United States feral goat issues arose on San Clemente Island off the coast of southern California. The goats were first introduced onto the island as of 1875 from another nearby island, Santa Catalina Island, and had not been properly managed since, allowing their population to spike up to about 15,000. This population had begun to damage the natural ecosystem of the island, destroying crops and other plant life as well as interfering with the animals that had used said plants as a food source. The United States Navy, being the owners of the island as of 1934, allowed hunting and trapping of these goats until 1972 when it was determined that this had not made a dent in the goat population. An official culling program had to be organized to properly exterminate the goats. 

The initial plan for handling the goat population involved going in with aerial forces and taking out the goats via helicopters. Fund for Animals, a non-government organization for ethical animal treatment, stopped this ruling though and suggested the alternative of auctioning off the goats to U.S. citizens on the mainland. This plan eliminated 3,000 goats from the island just by moving them to mainland farms to be domesticated once more, and many of the goats that had not been bought were adopted by the Fund for Animals agency instead to protect them. Any remaining goats were permitted to be shot by the United States Navy and as of 1991, the island has been declared free of its feral goat issue. The Livestock Conservancy considers them a critically endangered heritage breed.  In 2008, their global population was approximately 400, all domesticated.
The goats’ bleat is so consistent that it is sometimes confused with a recorded goat sound.

Wales
Feral goats occur in the Welsh mountains for example the Rhinogydd range in Snowdonia.  They are used for conservation grazing in a number of places, such as at Stackpole in South Wales or on Great Orme in Llandudno in North Wales.

Short- and long-term effects of invasion 
Feral goats in any country cause many long-term problems pertaining to the native vegetation. These problems are caused by overgrazing of these species, as well as the erosion of soil due to the loss of plant roots. These goats also affect native animal species because they are using a multitude of resources, causing an increased amount of competition. Lastly, they can affect the ecosystem by spreading plants and weeds into areas they aren't typically seen in through their excrement. This eventually causes damage because native species of plants now have competition.  Besides environmental damage, they also cause damage to the economy by damaging agriculture and causing the government to spend to control them.

References

External links

 
Introduced mammals of Australia
Invasive mammal species
Introduced animals of Hawaii